Yervandashat or Eruandashat ( (reformed);  (classical)), was an Armenian city and one of the historical capitals of Armenia, serving as the capital city between 210 and 176 BC under the rule of the Orontid dynasty and at the beginning of the rule of their successors, the Artaxiad dynasty.

Etymology

"Eruandashat", which translates as "Joy of Ervand (i.e. Orontes)", is the Armenian form of the toponym and derives from Middle Persian *Arwandašād (compare Old Persian *Aruvanta-šiyāti-).

History
Yervandashat was built around 210 BC by the last Orontid king Orontes IV of Armenia. It was at a height on the right bank of Aras River, in the Arsharunik canton of Ayrarat province of Armenia Major. Its site is 1 km east  of the modern Armenian village of Yervandashat, in the current Turkish Province of Iğdır.

According to Movses Khorenatsi, Orontes founded Yervandashat to replace Armavir as his capital after Armavir had been left dry by a shift of the Arax River.

Ancient Yervandashat was destroyed by the army of the Persian King Shapur II in the 360s AD.

The archaeological site has not been the subject of major excavation, but some preliminary examination of the fortifications has been done and some remains of palaces have been uncovered.

References

Former capitals of Armenia
Archaeological sites in Eastern Anatolia
History of Iğdır Province